Richard Neufeld (born November 6, 1944) was a Canadian Senator for British Columbia from his being appointed by the Right Hon. Prime Minister Stephen Harper in December 2008 until his aging out of the Canadian Senate upon his 75th birthday on November 6, 2019. Before his appointment to the Senate, he was a British Columbia Liberal Party Member of the Legislative Assembly of British Columbia from 1991 to 2008, serving as Minister of Energy, Mines and Petroleum Resources in the cabinet of Gordon Campbell.

Neufeld was first elected to the legislative assembly in the 1991 B.C. general election. He won the Peace River North riding as a member of the Social Credit party. He received 5,758 votes (54.79% of total valid votes) in a field of five candidates. Neufeld defected to the BC Reform Party following the electoral collapse of the SoCreds.

In the 1996 BC general election Neufeld was re-elected in the Peace River North riding as a member of the BC Reform party. He received 5,299 votes (48.41% of total valid votes) in a field of six candidates. He was one of two BC Reform candidates to be elected, the other being party leader Jack Weisgerber–thereby losing official party status. BC Reform's presence was blamed for splitting the centre-right vote, allowing the NDP to eke out a majority despite coming second in the popular vote behind the Liberals.

Following a conflict with then BC Reform leader Wilf Hanni, Neufeld defected to the BC Liberals in October 1997. During this time in the Official Opposition he served as energy, mines and northern development critic.

In the 2001 general election Neufeld was again re-elected in the Peace River North riding as the BC Liberal candidate. He received 6,629 votes (73.22% of total valid votes) in a field of four candidates. Neufeld was appointed Minister of Energy and Mines on June 5, 2001 by Premier Gordon Campbell.

In his position as Minister, Neufeld was at the centre of the fray regarding the "re-regulation" of BC Hydro, which involves privatization of some of that Crown corporation. Neufeld has also advocated the increased use of coal power, and has promoted allowing a scientific review of offshore oil and gas. His term as Minister of Energy and Mines was marked by significant growth in the oil and gas, and mining sectors.

In the 2005 general election Neufeld was again re-elected in the Peace River North riding as the BC Liberal candidate. He received 5,498 votes (59.37% of total valid votes) in a field of four candidates. Neufeld was re-appointed Minister of Energy, Mines and Petroleum Resources on June 16, 2005 by Premier Gordon Campbell.

Neufeld served on the Fort Nelson city council from 1978 to 1986, five of those years as mayor. He lives in Fort St. John.

On December 22, 2008, it was announced that Neufeld would be appointed to the Canadian Senate on the advice of Prime Minister Stephen Harper. He assumed office on January 2, 2009. Upon reaching his age 75, on November 6, 2019, Neufeld was aged out of the Canadian Senate per constitutionally-enshrined mandatory retirement rules.

Honours
 He was awarded the Freedom of the City of Fort St. John on 24 June 2019 and He formally received the honour on 26 November 2021.

References

British Columbia Liberal Party MLAs
Living people
1944 births
Conservative Party of Canada senators
Canadian senators from British Columbia
Mayors of places in British Columbia
Members of the Executive Council of British Columbia
People from Lethbridge
Reform Party of British Columbia MLAs
British Columbia Social Credit Party MLAs
21st-century Canadian politicians